Henry Cundell (1810-1886) was a Scottish painter, artist, and early photographer. He exhibited for a short time in the 1850s.

Biography 
Trade card in the British Museum collection says 

Henry Cundell's photographs are often attributed to either his brothers—George, Joseph, and Edward—or to his contemporary, Joseph Cundall. Sara Stevenson and A. D. Morrison-Low wrote that Henry Cundell "figured in touring exhibitions set up by the London Society of Arts between 1852 and 1854. His photographs ranged from pictures taken in North Wales, to Perthshire, Durham, and Kensington."

His best-known photo of London in 1844 was wrongly attributed to Joseph Cundall. Julie L. Mellby of the Princeton University wrote about that calotype:

Notes

References

Further reading

External links 
 Photo of Henry Cundell at National Portrait Gallery

Photography in Scotland
Photography in England
Scottish photographers
19th-century photographers